Pascale Fung (馮雁) (born in Shanghai, China) is a professor in the Department of Electronic & Computer Engineering and the  Department of Computer Science & Engineering at the Hong Kong University of Science & Technology(HKUST). She is the director of the newly established, multidisciplinary Centre for AI Research (CAiRE) at HKUST. She is an elected Fellow of the Institute of Electrical and Electronics Engineers (IEEE) for her “contributions to human-machine interactions”, an elected Fellow of the International Speech Communication Association for “fundamental contributions to the interdisciplinary area of spoken language human-machine interactions”  and an elected Fellow of the Association for Computational Linguistics (ACL) for her “significant contributions toward statistical NLP, comparable corpora, and building intelligent systems that can understand and empathize with humans”.

She is a member of the Global Future Council on Artificial Intelligence and Robotics, a think tank of the World Economic Forum, and blogs for the Forum's online publication Agenda. She is a member of the Partnership on AI. She has been invited as an AI expert to different government initiatives in China, Japan, the UAE, India, the European Union and the United Nations.

Fung's publication topics include spoken language systems, natural language processing, and empathetic human-robot interaction. She co-founded the Human Language Technology Center (HLTC) and is an affiliated faculty with the Robotics Institute and the Big Data Institute, both at HKUST. Additionally, she is the founding chair of the Women Faculty Association at HKUST. She is actively involved in encouraging young women into careers in engineering and science.

Early life and education
Fung was born to professional artist parents in Shanghai, China, who gave her an early education in the arts. Her mother was a graduate of the Central Academy of Fine Arts in Beijing, and her father of the Zhejiang Academy of Fine Arts (now known as the Chinese Academy of Fine Arts). An ethnic Han Chinese, she also has Indonesian and mixed ancestry through her maternal and paternal grandmothers. Her early immersion in the arts has a great impact on her interest in applying technology to art. At age 11, she emigrated to Hong Kong with her mother and sister while her father was permitted to join them later on. She has been a science fiction fan since she read her first book about robots at age seven. This, and her fondness of mathematics, motivated her to study computer engineering later on. She graduated from Belilios Public School, the oldest girls’ school in Hong Kong, where she founded the Electronics Club and the Astronomy Club. She did not find the environment encouraging to her ambition of becoming an engineer. This experience led her to actively engage in encouraging young women into STEM fields. She received her B.S. in electrical engineering from Worcester Polytechnic Institute in Massachusetts in 1988, her M.Sc. in computer science from Columbia University in 1993, and received her Ph.D. in computer science from Columbia University in 1997. She worked at AT&T Bell Labs from 1993 to 1997, as associate scientist at BBN Systems & Technologies in 1992, LIMSI, Centre National de la Recherche Scientifique France in 1991, and studied at the Department of Information Science, Kyoto University, Japan from 1989 to 1991, and at Ecole Centrale Paris, France in 1988–1989. Through these experiences, she has become a fluent speaker of seven European and Asian languages. She has two daughters, Belén W. Fung (born in 2005) and Coline F. Woo (born in 2008).

Career and research interests

Fung's work has always been focused on building intelligent systems that can understand and empathize with humans. During her career she authored and co-authored hundreds of publications, along with many journal listings and book chapters. Fung is often found in the media, among others as a writer for Scientific American, the World Economic Forum, and the London School of Economics, and the Design Society. She was a pioneer in using statistical models for natural language understanding. Her PhD thesis proposed unsupervised methods for aligning texts and mining dictionary translations in different languages by distributional properties. She is an expert in spoken language understanding and computer emotional intelligence, and is a strong proponent of technology transfer. Fung has applied many of her research group's results in the fields of, among others, robotics, IoT, and financial analytics. Her efforts led to the launch of the world's first Chinese natural language search engine in 2001, the first Chinese virtual assistant for smartphones in 2010, and the first emotional intelligent speaker in 2017.

Honors
Elected Fellow, Association for the Advancement of Artificial Intelligence (AAAI), for “significant contributions to the field of Conversational AI and to the development of ethical AI principles and algorithms” 
Elected Fellow, Association for Computational Linguistics (ACL), for “significant contributions toward statistical NLP, comparable corpora, and building intelligent systems that can understand and empathize with humans”
Nominee, the VentureBeat AI Innovation Awards at Transform 2020, for "AI for Good" 
Awardee, 2017 Outstanding Women Professionals & Entrepreneurs Award, Hong Kong Women Professionals & Entrepreneurs Association
Elected Fellow, Institute of Electrical and Electronics Engineers (IEEE), for “contributions to human-machine interactions”
Elected Fellow, International Speech Communication Association (ISCA), for “fundamental contributions to the interdisciplinary area of spoken language human-machine interactions"
Member, Global Future Council on AI and Robotics, World Economic Forum (2016–)
One of the Top 50 Women of Hope, selected by List Magazine in 2014
Selected as “My Favorite Teacher” by top engineering students in 2007 and in 2009

Affiliations

Fung is affiliated with the following institutions and organizations:
Hong Kong University of Science and Technology
World Economic Forum
Institute of Electrical and Electronics Engineers
Association for Computational Linguistics
International Speech Communication Association
Association for Computing Machinery
Association for the Advancement of Artificial Intelligence

See also
Kathleen McKeown
Roberto Pieraccini
Julia Hirschberg
Tony F. Chan
Shrikanth Narayanan

References 

Chinese computer scientists
Chinese women computer scientists
Columbia University alumni
Computer scientists
Fellow Members of the IEEE
Academic staff of the Hong Kong University of Science and Technology
Human–computer interaction researchers
Living people
Machine learning researchers
Natural language processing researchers
Scientists at Bell Labs
Women computer scientists
Worcester Polytechnic Institute alumni
Year of birth missing (living people)